Lex Luthor is a fictional supervillain appearing in American comic books published by DC Comics. As Superman's archenemy, he has been portrayed in almost every Superman media franchise and adaptation.

Lex Luthor is a major character within the Superman mythos and has appeared in many of Superman's adaptations into other media. The character is originally depicted as a mad scientist and later depicted as a wealthy, power-mad American business magnate running the technology company LexCorp which is based in the city of Metropolis. His portrayal in feature films ranges from being a vain criminal interested in real estate development to that of a genius who heads LexCorp.

Atom Man vs. Superman
Lex Luthor was first portrayed on film in the second Superman serial, Atom Man vs. Superman (1950). He was played by Lyle Talbot.

Feature films

Christopher Reeve/Brandon Routh series

Gene Hackman played the role of Lex Luthor in the 1978 movie Superman: The Movie and in two of its three sequels (Superman II and Superman IV: The Quest for Peace). Hackman's portrayal is a notable departure from the comic book incarnations. In the films, Luthor is portrayed as Superman's comedic foil, or as comic book critic Peter Sanderson puts it, "a used car salesman wielding nuclear missiles". In most of the films of this franchise, Luthor's main business interest is real estate speculation.

Superman: The Movie
In the 1978 movie Superman: The Movie, Lex Luthor is purely motivated by money, as well as the desire to swindle as tremendous a fortune as possible to prove his genius. Although he is bald, he wears a variety of wigs throughout the film to conceal it. Luthor's schemes are offset by a tendency to surround himself with unsatisfactory help; he is burdened by his bumbling henchman Otis, as well as his conscience-stricken girlfriend Eve Teschmacher. Luthor plots to divert a nuclear missile into hitting the San Andreas fault, causing California to sink into the ocean, thereby turning its neighboring states into prime beachfront property. Although Luthor nearly kills Superman using kryptonite, Superman escapes with the help of Teschmacher. After Superman repairs the damage to the San Andreas region, he delivers Luthor and Otis to prison. Luthor reveals his identity to the guards while removing his wig.

Superman II
Lex Luthor's role in Superman II is relegated to a supporting one, beginning with a jailbreak organized with the help of Miss Teschmacher while leaving Otis behind. After journeying to the Fortress of Solitude, Luthor learns of the existence of General Zod and the other Kryptonian criminals Ursa and Non. Hoping to rule his own continent once the evil Kryptonians take over Earth, Luthor allies himself with Zod. He asks Zod for control over real estate in Australia. However, when Superman confronts Zod and his cronies at the Fortress of Solitude at the film's climax, Luthor tricks Superman into revealing that there is a chamber in the Fortress which can nullify a Kryptonian's powers using synthetic red solar radiation- in essence turning a Kryptonian, such as Superman, Zod, and his followers Non and Ursa, into a vulnerable human. Fortunately, expecting Luthor's betrayal, Superman had already reversed the mechanism of the chamber, and when forced inside by Zod, the "red sun" beams are dispersed throughout the Fortress while Superman is safely shielded; Zod and his followers are defeated easily because of the loss of their powers. Luthor is sent back to prison. The final parts of Superman II: The Richard Donner Cut had Superman rotating the Earth backwards to prevent Luthor from escaping from prison while also making sure that General Zod, Ursa, and Non remain in the Phantom Zone.

Superman IV: The Quest for Peace
Lex Luthor reappears in Superman IV: The Quest for Peace, escaping from prison once more, this time with the aid of his nephew Lenny (portrayed by Jon Cryer) who uses his car to distract the guards when Luthor was working in the prison's rock pile. In the film, Luthor never takes off his wig. Once again, Lex allies himself with other villains, in this instance a cadre of war profiteers and arms dealers who are worried about what Superman's efforts toward nuclear disarmament will do to their business. Lex uses his own DNA combined with a strand of Superman's hair that is stolen from a museum to create a hybrid clone that he dubs Nuclear Man. The radioactive villain possesses abilities similar to Superman, but receives his power from direct sunlight, whereas Superman can still operate in darkness. Superman exploits this weakness eventually, destroying Nuclear Man. The Luthors are seen driving away from Metropolis incognito as Lex plans for them to lay low for a couple of years so that he can come up with a new plan. Superman drops Lenny off at Boys Town stating that Lenny was under a bad influence. Then he returns Lex to the prison rock pile and gives him to the guards. When Lex asked how Superman defeated his creation, Superman stated that he found out about Nuclear Man's weakness of being made from sunlight and used it to his advantage. Superman flies off stating to Lex that he will see him in 20 years.

Superman Returns
In the 2006 film Superman Returns, Lex Luthor is played by Kevin Spacey. Although retaining a humorous streak, Spacey's take on the character is drier and more straightforward than that of Hackman, and notably displays a more personal dislike and hatred for Superman. In the film, Luthor has been paroled from prison bent on revenge against Superman. Luthor funds his criminal operations by seducing a wealthy, elderly benefactor. Luthor's machinations once again concern real estate, as they did in the first two films. This time, he is assisted by his sidekick wealthy heiress Kitty Kowalski (Parker Posey).

Luthor plans to use Kryptonian crystals, like the one Superman used to create the Fortress of Solitude, to form a new continent, owned by Luthor, destroying the United States in the process and killing untold numbers of people. The landmass also has the added effect of sapping Superman's powers when he is in proximity, as Luthor has laced it with Kryptonite. While Superman is weakened, Luthor has his henchmen brutalize and torture him, before stabbing him with a shard of Kryptonite. Superman falls off the edge of the landmass into the Atlantic Ocean, presumably to his death. However, with the help of Lois Lane and Richard White, Superman recovers and hurls the landmass into space. After his scheme fails, Luthor uses a helicopter to escape capture, but it runs out of fuel stranding him on a deserted island with Kitty Kowalski as well as her dog. When she asks what they will eat, he looks at the dog hungrily.

DC Extended Universe

Man of Steel
The third theatrical Man of Steel trailer reveals the LexCorp Tower in the background of chaotic events, confirming the film's acknowledgment of the character. In the actual movie, while Superman is fighting General Zod, Zod manages to push Superman into two gasoline filled tanks on a gasoline truck, both with the LexCorp name. In addition, the building under construction where Zod sheds his armor is owned by LexCorp and would eventually become the LexCorp Tower in Batman v Superman: Dawn of Justice.

Batman v Superman: Dawn of Justice
David S. Goyer talked about the character in the Man of Steel sequel as a Bill Gates-like billionaire. Zack Snyder talked about seeing a modern take as a combination of Richard Branson and Brad Pitt. On January 31, 2014, it was reported that Jesse Eisenberg was cast as Lex Luthor in Batman v Superman: Dawn of Justice as the main antagonist.

Rather than an industrialist, Alexander Luthor Jr. is portrayed as a Millennial tech-mogul as a means of updating the character for modern times. He is an eccentric prodigy with psychopathic tendencies, monotheism, and a sociopathic demeanor. As a result of his abuse at the hands of his late father, who often portrayed himself in public as a benevolent figure, as well as never being saved by a "man in the sky", Luthor projects such hatred onto Superman and shows disdain for the public's interest in him. Luthor works to both kill and discredits him; going as far as unearthing Kryptonite from Zod's failed terraforming attempt in hopes of convincing Senator June Finch to use "deterrents" against Superman as well as framing him for murders in Africa and bombing the U.S. Capitol. Throughout the film, Luthor manipulates Batman into distrusting Superman, which includes allowing Batman to steal the Kryptonite for use against Superman. Luthor then activates the Genesis Chamber aboard the scout ship and splices his own DNA with Zod's, creating a deformed Kryptonian monster.

Luthor lures Superman to LexCorp Tower, where he reveals he has been aware of Superman's secrets for some time, and that he has kidnapped Martha Kent to blackmail Superman into fighting Batman. When this plan fails, Luthor unleashes his Kryptonian deformity, which he names Superman's "Doomsday", against Superman, Batman, and Wonder Woman, who kill it with Batman's Kryptonite spear. Luthor is arrested for his crimes, and his head is shaved upon being admitted into prison. In the Ultimate Edition of the film, Lex is seen communicating with Steppenwolf through Kryptonian holographic technology and is told Steppenwolf will come to Earth. At the end of the film, Luthor is referred to as "Prisoner AC-23-1940", a reference to his first appearance in Action Comics #23, published in 1940.

Justice League
Theatrical Cut
Jesse Eisenberg reprises his role as Lex Luthor in the film Justice League. He was originally planned to have a role in the main film but instead appears only in the post-credits scene where he is shown to have escaped prison, utilized his off-shore accounts with spare money to retreat to a lavish private yacht, with a group of female bodyguards. He is allied with Slade Wilson/Deathstroke, where he discusses with him about forming "a league of [their] own" to counter the newly formed Justice League, after learning about Superman's resurrection.

Snyder Cut
Eisenberg returned in the 2021 director's cut Zack Snyder's Justice League, with his original role restored. In the post-credits scene, he is shown to have escaped Arkham Asylum, teaming with Slade Wilson, to whom he revealed Batman's secret identity in exchange for his services.

Live action television
Lex Luthor is absent in the 1950s television series Adventures of Superman.

Superboy
Lex Luthor appeared in the syndicated television show Superboy (1988–1992), portrayed by Scott James Wells in season one and by Sherman Howard for subsequent seasons. Lex (Wells) first appeared as a rich, scheming college student. In early episodes, Luthor is preoccupied with showing up Superboy, rigging basketball games, and stealing priceless artefacts, among other small-time schemes. At the close of the first season, Superboy accidentally causes Luthor to go bald while saving him from a lab fire in an incident similar to the character's classic origin. Convinced that Superboy intentionally caused the accident, Luthor kills wealthy businessman Warren Eckworth and tries, unsuccessfully, to take his place via plastic surgery. In the guise as Warren, Lex (Howard) takes over Eckworth's "Superboy Gun" project and tries to kill Superboy with the weapon. In the Season Four two-parter "Know Thine Enemy", Luthor's childhood is explored when Superboy relives Lex's life via the 'psychodisk'. Similar to his post-Crisis origin, Lex is raised by an abusive father and neglectful mother; Lex becomes rich when he takes out an insurance policy on his parents and then kills them both. His sister Lena Luthor holds the distinction of being the sole person Lex cares about.

Lois & Clark: The New Adventures of Superman
Lex Luthor is a multi-billionaire in the television series Lois & Clark: The New Adventures of Superman (1993–1997), portrayed by actor John Shea.

In the beginning of the series, Lex is described as having recently become the world's third-richest person. In the eyes of the public, he appears to be a beloved humanitarian, but Superman knows the truth. During the show's first season, Clark Kent/Superman spends a good deal of time trying to prove that Luthor is corrupt, while Luthor tests Superman to find his weakness. He is often aided by his personal assistant Nigel St. John (portrayed by Tony Jay). Eventually, Luthor's investigation into Superman leads him to discover that he has a secret identity and he is determined to learn it. He makes several attempts to turn the public against Superman. At the end of the first season, Lex manages to acquire a rare piece of kryptonite; he then devises a trap for Superman that nearly kills him, though Superman narrowly escapes. In the first season finale, at the wedding of Lex to Lois Lane, the truth about his evil nature is exposed and he takes his own life by jumping from the roof of his building rather than face imprisonment. Due to exposure to Luthor's kryptonite, Superman's powers are too weak and he is unable to save him.

In the second season, Lex's corpse disappears from the coroner's office. Later on, the body resurfaces in a lab where his ex-wife Arianna Carlin (portrayed by Emma Samms) with the help of devoted scientist Gretchen Kelly (portrayed by Denise Crosby) freezes Luthor's remains and labors to bring him back from the dead. Blaming Superman and Lois for Luthor's death (Superman for not saving him and Lois for "driving him to his death" by saying 'No' at the altar), Arianna uses subliminal messaging to turn part of Metropolis against Superman, and uses plastic surgery to make a henchwoman look like Lois. Lois is then framed for several acts of law-breaking, and they try to make it seem like Lois is having a mental breakdown. Lois is then kidnapped after meeting her double, bound and gagged by Arianna, and drugged before Superman arrives. Superman is shot by a kryptonite bullet and the criminal places the gun in Lois's hands, hoping to frame Lois for the murder. Superman uses his heat vision to send water from a fish tank onto the face of Lois, reviving her and enabling her to remove the kryptonite. Arianna and the double are then jailed leaving Gretchen behind to care for Luthor's body. The scientist eventually succeeds, but as a side effect of his resurrection, Lex loses his hair (thus bringing him in line with the character's usual look). However, the effect was only temporary and a year later his hair grew back. He is quickly disenchanted with the changes that have happened during his absence, particularly the emergence of Intergang, as well as the loss of his personal fortune. Lex hides underground, again seeking kryptonite. But after kidnapping Lois in an attempt to reclaim her, he is traced to his sewer lair by Superman. This time however following Gretchen's accidental death and Nigel fleeing upon his defection to Intergang, Superman prevents Lex from taking his own life again to "cheat justice" and sends him to prison to serve a double life sentence.

In the third season, Luthor finds out about Lois and Clark's wedding and escapes after a whole year in prison, through an elaborate plot involving clones; first using a clone of the President to grant him a pardon, then kidnapping the real Lois to replace her with a clone just before her wedding to Clark. It is also revealed that, unbeknownst to Lois, Luthor hid some of his money in a bank account in Lois's name, about two hundred million dollars, which he later seeks to use to rebuild his wealth. Luthor hopes to transfer the minds of himself and the genuine Lois into clone bodies so they may never be found. Although he tricks Lois' clone into divulging Superman's secret identity, he still fails in destroying Superman, and is killed in the destruction of his lab in his underground subway hideout.

Unbeknownst to anyone, being a philanderer, Luthor has illegitimate children from his past trysts, two of whom try to kill Superman over the course of the last two seasons (characters question the idea that Luthor was old enough to have adult children, but dismiss it as an example of his lies and deceptions).

 The first one, Jaxon Xavier (portrayed by Andy Berman as a human and by Andrew Bryniarski in virtual form named X), was a billionaire and also a top scientist in Lex Labs (one of Lex's companies). Lois was told by Luthor that he had a son who died in a car crash with his mother and Jaxon is outraged by his father's lies about him. However, it is very likely that Luthor was referring to his other child since he didn't mention a name, and dialogues suggest that Jaxon believes that he is his father's only child. He entrapped Lois and Clark in a virtual reality world to steal information for mind control before the two with the help of Jimmy Olsen tricked Jaxon into letting them out by stealing his wristwatch escape window, leaving him stranded. Jaxon then crashed the system, leaving his mind trapped inside his virtual world forever.
 The second one, Lex Luthor Jr. (portrayed by Keith Brunsmann), is facially deformed and was disowned by his father, reduced to living in a furnished sewer/transit station beneath Metropolis. However, Lex Jr. has access to his father's hidden wealth, and he hires Leslie Luckaby (portrayed by Patrick Cassidy) as a handsome stand-in to impersonate him. The impostor poses as the public persona as he murders the CEOs of his father's old companies and rebuilds LexCorp. Lex Jr. and his impostor manage to get their hands on a recording of the elder Luthor, made before his death; a journal which includes Lex revealing his knowledge of Superman's secret identity. Both men are later killed in an explosion that levels the crypt.

Although Luthor appeared rarely after the first season, he is mentioned on several occasions. Despite being exposed as a criminal, there were still those loyal to him, including wealthy brothers Ethan and Eric Press (portrayed by Chip Esten and Jeff Juday) and several past lovers.

Smallville

The television series Smallville features a new version of Lex Luthor, portrayed by Michael Rosenbaum. Although his history echoes previous incarnations, this version did not begin as a bona fide villain. The series also tries to pin a more psychologically realistic take on the character, attempting to expand his character to fully flesh out his journey into what will turn him into the mythic DC supervillain from the comic books.

Arrowverse

Supergirl
Lex Luthor appeared in the Arrowverse series Supergirl, portrayed by Jon Cryer as an adult and by Aidan Fink as a child.

Lex was first seen in a flashback sequence as a young boy. The season premiere establishes that he has been recently arrested by Superman and is serving 32 consecutive life sentences in prison. However, still having some degree of access to his resources despite his imprisonment, he hires John Corben to assassinate his half-sister, Lena Luthor, due to the latter deciding to rebrand Luthor Corp to L-Corp to disassociate the company from him. His plans are foiled by Supergirl and Superman, and Corben ends up being shot by Lena, who believed her act of self-defense would embarrass Lex. In the episode "Luthors", James Olsen reveals to Kara that Clark Kent and Lex were once friends, and it is revealed later that he knows Supergirl's secret identity, making him an impending threat to her and her allies.

Lex later debuts as season four's main antagonist in the episode "O Brother, Where Art Thou?" In the episode, it is revealed that he placed a red sun over Metropolis in an attempt to kill Superman. Eventually, he is arrested and sent to Stryker's Island. But before he does, he had hired Eve Teschmacher as an undercover assistant at Cat Co. to spy on Jimmy. Shortly after Supergirl's battle with Reign, a Supergirl copy appears in Kasnia where she is taken in by the Russians. Lex is contacted by the Russians about the Supergirl copy they found. Lex decides to blend her in mankind and to become more like Kara Danvers. In the present, the Supergirl copy is exposed to Kryptonite gas. Lex decides to give himself cancer to that he can force his sister Lena to give him a cure she has been working on but he gets Eve to shoot Jimmy to use as a test dummy. It is also revealed that Otis Graves is alive and is working with Lex and gave him the cure. Just before they leave, Supergirl confronts Lex who manages to get away and give the cure to the Supergirl copy which he names "Red Daughter". After Red Daughter (supposedly) kills Supergirl, Lex betrays Kasnia and Red Daughter as part of his plan to become a public hero and to clear the Luthor name. After being defeated by Supergirl and retreating back to his lair, Lex is shot by Lena. Before he dies, Lex reveals to Lena that Kara is Supergirl. Later, his body is retrieved by the Monitor who starts to work on it.

In season 5, Lex has been revived as the Monitor needs his help in averting an impending Crisis; specifically his mind. Lex agrees to help in exchange for the Monitor's help with a favor involving Lena. During the crossover, Kara is horrified to learn that Lex is alive and finds the Monitor to be untrustworthy for resurrecting him. However, Lex has a secret agenda; stealing the Book of Destiny and scour the multiverse so he can kill every iteration of Superman possible like the one on Earth-75. While on Earth-167 however, he finds that the Clark Kent of that Earth has renounced his powers as a Kryptonian so he can be with his family. Though Lex tries to fight this Clark, he gets a punch in the face and tries unsuccessfully to taunt him that he would die anyway because of the Crisis. Giving up his killing spree, Lex eventually catches up to Iris, Lois, and his Superman on Earth-96, where he uses the Book of Destiny to hypnotize its Superman and pit him against Superman-38. However, he is knocked out by Lois, and both she and Iris are able to use the Book of Destiny to restore Earth-96 Clark back to his former self. On the Waverider-74, Lex is kept incarcerated, though he continues to be a nuisance. After the Anti-Monitor attacks the heroes and wipes them out, Pariah teleports the seven heroes capable of stopping the Anti-Monitor to the Vanishing Point to ensure their survival. To ensure his own survival however, Lex used the Book once more to switch places with Superman-96. After a brief fight with Supergirl in the Monitor's past, Lex helps in fighting the Shadow Demons at the dawn of time. In the final part of "Crisis on Infinite Earths" where Earth-1, Earth-38, and the unnamed Earth from Black Lightning were combined to form Earth-Prime, Lex is shown to have won a Nobel Peace Prize and LuthorCorp is now the owner of the D.E.O. much to the dismay of Kara. After having learned of a powerful criminal organization the Leviathan secretly manipulated him through Eve Tessmacher prior to the Crisis, Lex puts his obsession with Superman and Supergirl aside to focus on them for revenge, yet would subtly manipulate events in Supergirl's life to torment her such as getting Eve Tessmacher kills Jeremiah Danvers. He is even able to cast doubts to everyone including Lena due to his apparent reformation. He takes pleasure of Supergirl's paranoia since she anticipates his direct attacks when he is actually busy dealing with the Leviathan. Due to what his female counterpart said, Brainiac 5 helps Lex when it comes to Leviathan. Lex's plots involved stealing a high-tech cube from Winn Schott's time ship and allying with a Winn Schott from an unnamed Earth who operates as Toyman. Eventually, after Brainiac 5 shrinks the Leviathan members Rama Khan, Tezumak, and Sela into a bottle, Lex takes it as a memento of his victory against them and for other schemes. He then gives the bottle to Lillian.

In season 6, Lex Luthor goes a head with his next phase of his plan by having Lillian copying the powers of the Leviathan members into him and beginning a broadcast that would harm those that don't have Obsidian Platinum lenses. During the fight at the Fortress of Solitude, Lex Luthor was hit by a fragment from Jarhanpur yet managed to use the Phantom Zone Projector to send Supergirl into the Phantom Zone. While incarcerated at National City Prison, Lex was visited by Lillian who stated that she told him so. Lena then arrives and uses the Myriad to erase their memories of Supergirl's identity from their minds. After being found not guilty by discrediting the witnesses for the prosecution, Lex and Lena fight for control of LuthorCorp. Due to Lex having Otis sabotage the new children's wing at the hospital and noting that killing him again won't change anything, Lena told Lex that she is leaving LuthorCorp. Lex later heard about the campaign of the 5th Dimensional Imp Nyxlygsptlnz and began to help her starting with sending her a Lexosuit with an A.I. modeled after her. After the Dream Totem was obtained by Nyxlygsptlnz, she was instructed by the Nyxlygsptlnz A.I. to place the Dream Totem in the Lexosuit's hand. Nyxlygsptlnz does so and Lex is teleported to her.

Lex and Nyxlygsptlnz work together to acquire the full totems, but despite their temporary success, Kara and her friends are able to disrupt the Allstone and prevent their enemies drawing on its power, with Nyxlygsptlnz killing Lillian Luthor in the process. Lex attempts to turn the tables by opening a portal to the Phantom Zone to attack Kara, her allies and the people of National City, but this plan backfires on him as the Phantoms attack those who are afraid, and none of those who believe in Supergirl are afraid whereas Lex and Nyxlygsptlnz's hubris hides their own fear. The Phantoms take Lex and Nyxlygsptlnz into the Zone themselves.

Superman & Lois
In the series premiere of Superman & Lois, the character initially announced as "The Stranger", played by Wolé Parks, is seemingly revealed as "Captain Luthor" from another Earth. However, in the seventh episode of the series, it is revealed that the Stranger is actually John Henry Irons and that his A.I. is mistakenly calling him Captain Luthor as his suit of armor was originally designed for his world's Lex Luthor. Though Luthor is set to appear in the series' third season, Cryer confirmed that he will not be reprising the role. The role of Lex will now be portray by Michael Cudlitz.

Titans
Lex Luthor appears in Titans, portrayed by Page Novak as a child and by Titus Welliver in season 4. This version is in his late 60s and sports a long beard. In the flashbacks seen in "Connor", a younger Lex Luthor is seen. Lionel Luthor stated to Connor that Lex and Clark used to be good friends.

Animation

Early animation

The New Adventures of Superman
Lex Luthor's first television appearance was in Filmation's The New Adventures of Superman. Lex Luthor appeared in a total of ten episodes spanning the three seasons of the series, such as:Merlin's Magic Marbles, Luthor's Lethal Laser and Can A Luthor Change His Spots?. He was voiced by Ray Owens and is identified in most of his appearances as "the world's greatest criminal scientist." His appearance is notably different in the cartoon's 1968 season as opposed to its first two seasons, as Luthor is noticeably slimmer.

Super Friends
Lex Luthor was a recurring villain in Hanna-Barbera's Super Friends franchise, voiced by Stanley Jones.

 Lex Luthor makes his Super Friends debut as the primary villain of Challenge of the Super Friends. He was the head of the Legion of Doom, a coalition of villains who plotted the downfall of the titular heroes.
 The World's Greatest Super Friends episode "Lex Luthor Strikes Back" features Lex Luthor escaping from jail and challenging the Super Friends by enlisting the help of a race of fire beings from the Sun.
 He also appears in the series Super Friends: The Legendary Super Powers Show, in the opening and the episodes "No Honor Among Super Thieves (in which acquires his power suit from the comics of then), Case of the Shrinking Super Friends (where he shrinks the younger half of the Super Friends) and The Mask of Mystery (where he steals a copy of the Hall of Justice data from an incompetent superhero named Captain Mystery).
 In the series The Super Powers Team: Galactic Guardians, Lex Luthor appears in some episodes as The Seeds of Doom where he attacks a building in a giant spider mech until he is defeated by the Super Friends with the help of Cyborg.

Superman Peanut Butter
Lex Luthor appeared in the animated commercial for Sunnyland Refining Company Superman Peanut Butter.

Ruby-Spears animated series
In the short-lived 1988 animated series produced by Ruby-Spears Enterprises, Lex Luthor (voiced by Michael Bell) was shown as a crooked businessman for the first time in other media who uses loopholes to cover up his illegal activities and shown wearing a Kryptonite ring which keeps Superman from getting close to him. He has a personal assistant named Jessica Morganberry (voiced by Lynne Marie Stewart).

DC Animated Universe
Lex Luthor appears as a major antagonist in the DC Animated Universe, voiced by Clancy Brown.

Superman: The Animated Series
In Superman: The Animated Series, this version is a corrupt businessman controlling Metropolis. While Luthor comes into conflict many times over the course of the series, he is always ultimately foiled, but never charged with any crime due to lack of evidence.

Justice League
In Justice League, Lex Luthor is finally exposed as a criminal and loses his business empire. His character turns more toward the original conception of a criminal genius obsessed with destroying Superman. Early in the series, his criminal activities are finally exposed by Batman, Green Lantern and Martian Manhunter and achieves sufficient evidence to prove his guilt. He also learns that he is suffering from a rare but deadly blood cancer caused by long-term exposure to a piece of Kryptonite he carried for years. While in prison, he bribes the Ultra-Humanite for freedom, and the two band together and ultimately form the first iteration of the Injustice Gang with Shade, Copperhead, Star Sapphire, Cheetah, Solomon Grundy and even the Joker (though Luthor remains having a grudge against the Joker as he remembers events from their first alliance against Superman and Batman). Ultra-Humanite's technology allows Lex to wear a special chest-plate that stops the spread of his cancer, as well being part of an armored suit that gives himself a fighting chance against Superman, blaming the Man of Steel for him being terminal. However, Lex is betrayed by Ultra-Humanite when approached with an offer by Batman.

After a fight with Superman and Hawkgirl, Lex uses his criminal genius to manipulate the android A.M.A.Z.O. to help him.

After assisting against alternate fascist superheroes from a parallel universe, Luthor is eventually pardoned from his crimes, and implies that he is considering entering the field of politics.

Justice League Unlimited
In Justice League Unlimited, Lex continues to have a central role and becomes the overarching antagonist of the series.

In the first season, Lex continues to run for the President of the United States. Behind the scenes, he financially backs a shadowy government organization dedicated to eradicating the Justice League if they ever turned on Earth's population. Luthor's actions cause Captain Marvel to quit the League, and the Question attempts to assassinate him so Superman cannot. At this point, Lex's Presidency is revealed to be a ruse to enrage Superman. Unknown to anyone, Luthor uses Cadmus to gain access to technology necessary to build his own duplicate of A.M.A.Z.O., intending to transfer his mind into the android body and gain immortality. He is thwarted by Amanda Waller and the seven founding Justice League members. At this point, it is revealed that Brainiac has been hiding within Luthor ever since Superman: The Animated Series, and ultimately convinces Luthor to fuse with him to help his goal of recreating the universe. However, they are defeated by the Flash, who briefly disappears from existence in the process, but manages to return from the Speed Force dimension. Afterwards, Luthor is arrested again.

In the final season, Luthor continually speaks to a hallucination of Brainiac, and is obsessed with rebuilding him and regaining his lost "godhood". After escaping prison, he joins the Secret Society led by Gorilla Grodd to obtain a piece of Brainiac in his possession, but later kills him and takes over leadership. His attempt to resurrect Brainiac ends up mistakenly resurrecting Darkseid, who attacks the Secret Society before heading to Earth. No longer able to see or hear Brainiac in his mind, Luthor then aids the League in defeating Darkseid, though he makes it clear that he cares less about saving the world and more about getting revenge on Darkseid for robbing him of his quest for power. With Metron's aid, Luthor acquires the Anti-Life Equation long sought by Darkseid and uses it on him, absorbing them both into the Source Wall permanently.

Animated film

Superman: Brainiac Attacks
Lex Luthor was also featured in the direct-to-video animated film Superman: Brainiac Attacks, voiced by Powers Boothe. Although using the same design from the DC Animated Universe, this Luthor is more comical, resembling more of the Gene Hackman version as opposed to the cold, calculating character from the animated series.

In the film, Luthor forms an alliance with Brainiac, whose original body was destroyed by Superman. Luthor manages to recover a piece of Brainiac's remains and takes it back to his lab in Metropolis, where he uses his technology to revive Brainiac. Luthor then offers a deal to the alien cyborg: he would offer him a new robot body and sent him to destroy Superman. Afterwards Brainiac would pretend to be defeated by Luthor and then leave Earth to conquer a different planet, while Luthor would appear as a hero to a people and then continue his quest to rule Earth. Seeing this as an opportunity, Brainiac accepts the deal, and Luthor sends Brainiac over to his LexCorp satellite in space, where Brainiac modifies it as his new body. As such, Luthor waited as Brainiac tracks down Superman and seemingly kills him in his Fortress of Solitude before returning to Metropolis to fulfill his side of the deal. At first, they seemingly put on a good show of a fight, but unfortunately, Brainiac betrays Luthor, now intending to conquer Earth himself; he even destroyed the self-destruct mechanism that Luthor placed in case of the possibility that he would be double-crossed.

Brainiac then defeats Luthor in a physical confrontation and continues to rampage on Metropolis, much to Luthor's dismay. However, Superman arrives to the rescue (having escaped the explosion of the Fortress by traveling to the Phantom Zone) and manages to permanently destroy Brainiac, much to the relief and joy of everyone (including Luthor, who has been sent to the hospital to recuperate from his injuries that were inflicted by Brainiac). Despite being relieved that Brainiac is finally gone for good and his attempts to win noble credit for "helping Superman", Luthor is shocked to find out that the authorities have found a piece of kryptonite inside Brainiac's remains, and that the container contains Luthor's company insignia, thus exposing his involvement of Brainiac's attacks. Seeing that he is now in big trouble and that the authorities are now on to him, Luthor secretly tells Mercy to call in all of his lawyers.

Superman: Doomsday
Lex Luthor is featured in the direct-to-video animated film Superman: Doomsday,  voiced by James Marsters. Although he's shown to be highly intelligent, he is also extremely amoral, having Lexcorp scientists find ways to slow the treatment of said cures just to make a higher profit.

In the film, Luthor is indirectly responsible for the release of the creature Doomsday. Upon discovering that the latent radiation from the Earth's core can be harnessed for energy purposes, LexCorp has been illegally drilling into the earth. When Luthor's miners stumble upon Doomsday's alien spacecraft while digging, they accidentally damage it and awaken Doomsday from his long slumber. After the creature slaughters the mining team, Luthor orders Mercy Graves to cover up his involvement; when all other loose ends have been tied up, Luthor kills Mercy to prevent any chance of a leak.

Following Superman and Doomsday's battle, Superman is presumed deceased, and Luthor is free of all culpability. Rather than being pleased, Luthor is incensed that he has been robbed of the chance of doing the deed himself. Luthor then robs Superman's body from his grave with the intention of creating genetic clones of the Man of Steel. The first clone was made to replace Superman while secretly tending to Luthor's own dirty work, but his methods grow much more violent than the original: killing crooks, threatening careless civilians, and generally behaving like a public menace, even causing the death of Toyman by dropping the madman from a large height during the criminal's arrest because Toyman killed a little girl. Meanwhile, the real Superman's corpse disappears from LexCorp during an electrical blackout (it is later revealed that Superman's robot servant at the Fortress of Solitude rescued him after seeing minor pulse fluctuations through separate days, realizing Superman was not dead).

Luthor is visited in his office by Lois Lane. Luthor tries to seduce Lois and they kiss, but Lois uses a tranquilizer on Luthor and knocks him unconscious; Lois believes he is the one behind Superman's strange behavior. Lois and Jimmy Olsen uncover Luthor's cloning project, but Luthor reappears and tries to kill them with a gun. Fortunately, Superman's clone has freed himself from Luthor's control and steps in to rescue Lois and Jimmy, and brutally destroys his entire cloning project. Luthor runs to a room with red sun lamps, which will neutralize Superman's powers; and dons kryptonite gloves with the intention of beating the insolent clone to death. Instead, the clone traps Luthor in the vault, rips its foundation out of the building, and throws the vault across Metropolis. At the end of the film, it is revealed that Luthor survived, but with severe injuries. He is aware of the real Superman's resurrection at this point.

Justice League: The New Frontier
Lex Luthor appears briefly in the animated film Justice League: The New Frontier. He is shown in LexCo during the scene in which John F. Kennedy made his famous speech.

Superman/Batman: Public Enemies
Clancy Brown reprised his role of Lex Luthor in the film adaption of the comic book Superman/Batman: Public Enemies. In the film, Luthor is elected President of the United States. When a massive Kryptonite meteor streaks toward Earth, Luthor attempts to form a pact with Superman to destroy the meteor, but later frames Superman for the murder of the villain Metallo, convincing the public that the Man of Steel has been psychologically influenced by the Kryptonite radiation. He places a $1 billion bounty on Superman's head, forcing Superman and Batman go on the run while trying to find a way to clear Superman's name, stop the meteor from striking Earth, and expose Luthor as a traitor. It is later revealed that Luthor ordered Major Force to kill Metallo and pin the event on Superman. During the film, Luthor attempts to destroy the meteor with nuclear weapons, but the radiation produced by the meteor prematurely detonates the nukes. As a result, Luthor becomes disillusioned by his failure, and since he was already mentally unstable due to the Artificial Kryptonite and Bane's Venom infusions he was taking in secret, he decides to let the meteor hit so he can rule what's left of the planet. When he goes to fight Superman as a 13-year-old Toyman puts his plan into action to destroy the meteor, he dons a high tech battle suit powered by the kryptonite pumping through his veins and puts up a fairly good fight against Superman. However, the Venom eventually wears off and Superman is able to slowly strip the suit from Luthor. With Luthor's impeachment and subsequent incarceration with a testimony from Amanda Waller over his secret infusions, he is driven completely insane as he's taken away to jail.

Justice League: Crisis on Two Earths

Chris Noth voices a benevolent version of Alexander "Lex" Luthor from a parallel universe on Justice League: Crisis on Two Earths. In the film, Luthor was the leader of his world's Justice League until the Crime Syndicate eradicated every member, leaving him as the sole survivor. To save his world, Luthor travels to a parallel Earth to enlist the Justice League's aid. Having visited this Earth beforehand, Luthor learned of his mad counterpart's existence and because of the authorities initial distrust toward him, Luthor made a brief sarcastic remark of "destroying the world" to get the League's attention. Luthor and the League eventually agree to work together to defeat the Syndicate.

In battle, Luthor uses a yellow and black power suit, an alternate version of the evil Lex Luthor's green and purple warsuit; much like his counterpart's, his power suit allows him jet boot-assisted flight, enhanced strength, projection of beams from wrist blasters, and force fields around himself, and a piece of a small piece of blue kryptonite kept in one of its compartments to use against Ultraman. However, unlike his counterpart's suit, Luthor's is not cumbersome due to him not completely reliant on its gadgetry which aids his efficiency in combat. In addition, it also equipped with the quantum trigger, dimensional transporter, and a mini-computer in the left glove.

The regular version also appears, but is shown to be in his prison cell on Stryker's Island, through Superman's telescopic and x-ray visions when Superman had to make sure that his Lex Luthor is still locked up.

All-Star Superman
Lex Luthor appears in All-Star Superman, voiced by Anthony LaPaglia. This version is in prison but plots to kill Superman and obtain his powers. He ultimately succeeds in gaining powers, which allow him to see the fabric of the universe and understand the entirety of reality, but is defeated by Superman. When Luthor laments all the good he could have done with his superpowers after losing them, Superman points out that he already squandered that chance when he instead chose to use them to further his vendetta against Superman. After Superman's apparent death, Luthor, in a gesture of atonement, provides a template for replicating Superman's genetic structure in a human embryo. He appeared to know of Lois's desire to have children with Superman, given when Dr. Lee Quintum stated "they always wanted to have children".

Lego Batman: The Movie - DC Super Heroes Unite
Lex Luthor appears in Lego Batman: The Movie - DC Super Heroes Unite, with Clancy Brown reprising his role.

Justice League: The Flashpoint Paradox
Lex Luthor appears in Justice League: The Flashpoint Paradox, voiced by Steve Blum. In the distorted 'Flashpoint' timeline, he and Deathstroke are captains of a ship as they set out to find Aquaman's doomsday device, but the ship is suddenly attacked by Aquaman's Atlantean army. Lex is wounded when Deathstroke and the crews were killed; Lex is executed as Aquaman says 'no survivors'.

JLA Adventures: Trapped in Time
Lex Luthor appears in JLA Adventures: Trapped in Time, voiced by Fred Tatasciore. In this version, Luthor is based on his "Challenge of the Super Friends" self, leading a smaller version of the Legion of Doom (Giganta, Sinestro, Riddler and Scarecrow are not part of the group). He attempts to reverse global warming by inducing ice to grow in the Arctic, thanks to Captain Cold's satellite, to lower the level of the world's oceans; with the decrease in water, the world would have to submit to the Legion's rule to get more. Unfortunately, Captain Cold loses his temper when the Super Friends attack the satellite and causes the machine to overload and send down too much power to the Arctic; as a result, Lex becomes trapped in ice. In the 32nd century, Luthor is revealed to have been found 500 years earlier and put in a museum dedicated to the Super Friends by the Legion of Super-Heroes. Unfortunately, Karate Kid accidentally frees Luthor by hitting the ice's weak point. Lex finds a mystical hourglass that contains a malevolent time entity named Time Trapper; Lex uses him to travel back to his home era. However, after an attempt to prevent Superman from staying on Earth as a baby fails, Lex's past self is rescued by the Super Friends, causing the entire timeline to become moot.

However, the future appears to have been changed thanks to something else that changed in the past. As a statue that was supposed to be dedicated to Superman is now dedicated to him.

Justice League: Throne of Atlantis
Lex Luthor made a cameo appearance in the post-credits scene for Justice League: Throne of Atlantis, voiced by Steve Blum. When Ocean Master is locked up in Belle Reve, he is approached by Luthor.

Justice League: Gods and Monsters
An alternate universe Lex Luthor appears in Justice League: Gods and Monsters, voiced by Jason Isaacs. Apparently paralyzed by an unspecified illness some years ago, Luthor has retreated to a space station to contemplate the knowledge he downloaded from Superman's spaceship, later sharing his knowledge of Project Fair Play - his efforts to devise a means of defeating the Justice League- when Superman comes to contact him about the deaths of various scientists who have apparently been killed by the Justice League, with the only common denominator being their role in the project. He is supposedly killed by a Metal Man meant to frame Superman, but he teleported just in time. During the fight between Superman, Wonder Woman, and Steve Trevor's soldiers, he teleports in to warn them that the true villain is revealed to be Doctor Will Magnus. After the situation is resolved Luthor departs to explore other universes with Wonder Woman, in a chair that resembles the Mobius Chair used by Metron. Before he goes he gives Superman the Kryptonian files to improve the science of Earth.

Justice League vs. Teen Titans
He appeared in Justice League vs. Teen Titans, voiced again by Steve Blum. He appears as the leader of the Legion of Doom which also consists of Cheetah, Solomon Grundy, Weather Wizard, and a new villain called Toymaster. Lex Luthor leads the attack on the Hall of Justice, but ends up defeated.

The Death of Superman and Reign of the Supermen
He appears in The Death of Superman and its second part Reign of the Supermen, voiced by Rainn Wilson. Lex is now under house arrest but is able to periodically escape thanks to one of his scientists wearing the tracking anklet. To combat Superman, he funds Dabney Donovan's cloning research which results in the creation of Superboy. After Superman's death, he reveals Superboy to the public as a LexCorp funded superhero. Superboy begins to question his existence and discovers that Lex donated part of his DNA for the cloning project, making Superboy his son. After the Justice League is teleported to another dimension, Lex helps Lois Lane use a Mother Box to bring them back to Earth. In exchange, all investigations in his criminal exploits are dismissed and he becomes a probationary member of the Justice League.

The Lego Movie 2: The Second Part
Lex Luthor appears in The Lego Movie 2: The Second Part, voiced by Ike Barinholtz. In the film's opening monologue, he is seen being held in captivity by the Justice League. He is later shown to be Superman's butler and best friend in the Systar System when under the influence of glitter.

Batman: Hush
Lex Luthor appears in the film Batman: Hush, voiced again by Rainn Wilson. While still a probationary member of the Justice League, Batman visits him for information on a delivery list of an ethylene compound to track down Poison Ivy's location.

Justice League Dark: Apokolips War
Lex Luthor appears in Justice League Dark: Apokolips War, voiced again by Rainn Wilson. Following the Justice League's unsuccessful assault on Apokolips, Luthor became a New God representative, reporting to Batman, now under the brainwash of Darkseid through a Mobius Chair, on the Reaper operation. He is revealed to be, however, just a mole working with Lois Lane. He provides Lois' team with Kryptonite-made weapons to fight off the Paradooms and prevent them from reaching the Boom Tube. He is later shown having been impaled and killed by one of the Paradooms during the final assault. However, this timeline is erased by the Flash when he time travels to prevent these events from happening.

Superman: Man of Tomorrow
Lex Luthor appears in Superman: Man of Tomorrow, voiced by Zachary Quinto.

Teen Titans Go! & DC Super Hero Girls: Mayhem in the Multiverse
Lex Luthor appears in Teen Titans Go! & DC Super Hero Girls: Mayhem in the Multiverse, with Will Friedle reprising his voice role from the 2019 reboot.

DC League of Super Pets
Lex Luthor appears in DC League of Super-Pets, voiced by Marc Maron. In the film, he plots to gain superpowers by drawing orange kryptonite from space with a tractor beam, but is thwarted by the Justice League alongside Krypto. In the process, he also learns that the kryptonite is useless, although in reality it only works on pets. Luthor is subsequently arrested, but is busted out by Lulu, a guinea pig and one of his former lab rats who has used the kryptonite to power up. He quickly betrays Lulu and attempts to steal credit for her capturing of the Justice League, but is trapped inside a rocket at the top of LexCorp alongside them. In the end, the rocket is downed, but Luthor remains trapped in his cage.

Other animation

Krypto the Superdog
Lex Luthor appears in Krypto the Superdog, voiced by Brian Dobson. This version has a pet iguana named Ignatius (voiced by Scott McNeil), who like him is intelligent, vain, and morally ambivalent.

Legion of Super Heroes
In the Legion of Super Heroes episode "Legacy", the young Superman meets Alexis (voiced by Tara Strong), the "richest girl in the galaxy" in the 31st century, who also has a knack with machinery and access to her own corporation's powerful technology. A beautiful redhead who wears a purple jumpsuit (echoing Lex Luthor's original hair color and classic costume), Alexis starts out as a friend of Superman, but is scorned when he prioritizes his duties with the Legion over spending time with her. She attacks the Legion out of revenge, but is ultimately defeated and arrested, with most of her hair being burnt off in the explosion of her battlesuit. She is then briefly seen in the season one finale, still in prison, and again in the season two premiere escaping with a crowd of inmates.

Young Lex makes an appearance in the tie-in comic Legion of Super Heroes in the 31st Century #13. Making his Metropolis debut, Superman saves Lex and the surrounding crowd from Lex's out-of-control prototype battle suit. Though this version of Lex does not yet show hostility towards Superman, Brainiac 5 warns Superman to keep an eye on Lex.

The Batman
Lex Luthor appeared in the fifth season of The Batman, with Clancy Brown reprising his role from the DCAU. Luthor hires Metallo (equipped with Luthor's only piece of Kryptonite) to defeat Superman, but is defeated by Batman. As Lex leaves for Gotham with his right-hand assistant Mercy Graves, Luthor hires Black Mask and Clayface (Basil Karlo) to kidnap Lois Lane to bring to Gotham as part of a diversion for Superman. While Superman, Batman, and Robin fight Black Mask and his henchmen while assisted by Bane, Mr. Freeze and Clayface, Luthor mixes Poison Ivy's mind-controlling spores and his Kryptonite dust to make Superman into his personal slave. It is revealed also that Luthor had previously confiscated technology from the remains of the Joining to create an army of robots to take over the world, ostensibly to protect it from future alien threats by interfacing with weaponry of Earth to create a global army under his control. However, after Batman frees Superman from Lex's control, both of them overpower and defeat Lex.

Batman: The Brave and the Bold
Two versions of the character appear on Batman: The Brave and the Bold.

 The first version is Luthor himself, voiced by Kevin Michael Richardson. This version is still an enemy of Superman, but has occasionally fought other heroes as well, including Batman, Wonder Woman, and the Justice League International.
 The second version is Rohtul (voiced by Clancy Brown), Luthor's counterpart from Zur-En-Arrh and the archenemy of Batman of Zur-En-Arrh.
 Luthor also appears in issue #1 of the Batman: The Brave and the Bold comic, controlling a composite monster that attacks Batman and Power Girl in England.

Young Justice
Lex Luthor is featured in Young Justice, voiced by Mark Rolston. This version is a member of the Light, as well as being the  donor for the human half of Superboy's DNA. In the second-season finale episode "Endgame", when the Reach activated their machines which will destroy the Earth with natural disasters, Luthor temporarily allies with the Justice League to help defeat them. In the aftermath, G. Gordon Godfrey starts campaigning for Luthor to replace the now-resigned UN Secretary General, much to the Justice League's dismay.

In the third season that take place two years after the Reach's defeat, Lex Luthor has made a law where the Justice League can't interfere in metahuman trafficking plots, causing some of its members to resign. Luthor later calls in Flash to make the Outsiders look bad during a U.N. conference. Later, Luthor's attempts to smear the Outsiders' reputation further while on G. Gordon Godfrey's show backfire as public opinion and the Outsiders' parents support them (though the latter initially wanted them to stop). Luthor later forms Infinity, Inc. to help the Light discredit the Outsiders. At the end of the third season, Black Lightning, Oracle and Cyborg trace Tara's communicator to expose Lex as a meta-trafficker. With Superman and Superboy backing them up through his cloning projects, they successfully get Lex removed from his position.

Lego Batman: Be-Leaguered
Lex Luthor appears in the animated television special Lego DC Comics: Batman Be-Leaguered, voiced by John DiMaggio.

Justice League Action
Lex Luthor appears in Justice League Action, voiced by James Woods. He is one of a few incarnations of the character who admits to having been a redhead, like he does in Superman No. 4 (1940).

DC Super Hero Girls 
Lex appears in DC Super Hero Girls voiced by Will Friedle. This version is a teenager with a pronounced sibling rivalry with Lena.

Harley Quinn
Lex Luthor appears in Harley Quinn, voiced by Giancarlo Esposito. In "So You Need A Crew?", he appears on the news to announce that Doctor Psycho has been banished from the Legion of Doom for saying the "C-word" on national television. In "L.O.D.R.S.V.P.", the Legion of Doom invites Harley Quinn to become a new member and reinstates Psycho, but he secretly tells Poison Ivy that the Legion is only interested in her and threatens to not let Harley join unless she does too. Ivy refuses and tries to warn Harley, but  Luthor inducts Harley anyway to ruin their friendship. While the Legion of Doom's headquarters was destroyed by the Joker in the season one finale, "The Final Joke", Luthor survived as he reappeared in the season two episode "Bachelorette" trying to purchase Themyscira for LexCorp from Eris only to be thwarted by Harley and Ivy. In the season three finale "The Horse and The Sparrow", Luthor returns once again as he plans to reform the Legion of Doom. He invites Ivy to lead it in exchange for killing the newly-elected Mayor Joker. While Ivy initially accepts the deal, she ultimately spares the Joker after talking with him about her relationship with Harley and realizing the latter does not want to be a villain anymore.

Parodies
 In Tiny Toons Adventures, the character Montana Max parodies as Wex Wuthor in the "Superbabs" segment where he causes havoc in Acme Acres and was opposed by Superbabs. In "New Class Day" Wex Wuthor attacks the Just-Us League of Supertoons and steals their powers. He was defeated by Batduck because he doesn't have superpowers.
 Lex Luthor appears in Robot Chicken, voiced by Seth Green (initially), Donald Faison (in "Toyz in the Hood"), Jim Cummings (in "Due to Constraints of Time and Budget"), and Alfred Molina (in the DC Comics specials). In the episode "Toyz in the Hood", he carpools to work with Skeletor, Cobra Commander and Mumm-Ra which ends with their car caught in traffic. He mentions about having a teleporter on his wrist yet he rides with the villains. At some point during the trip, he ends up annoyed by some kids in the next car who insult him, causing Luthor to shoot the tires. When their parking space is stolen by the archenemies of the villains, Lex uses his teleporter and ends up in the car with the kids who insulted him. In the episode "Due to Constraints of Time and Budget" (a segment that parodies a scene from the Superman film), Lex uses a supersonic frequency to contact Superman which also drives the animals crazy enough for them to leave Metropolis on a raft. The newspaper states that Superman stopped Lex, but the escaping animals have drowned. Lex Luthor appears as a central character in Robot Chicken DC Comics Special and Robot Chicken DC Comics Special 2: Villains in Paradise. He later appears with various versions of himself in Robot Chicken DC Comics Special III: Magical Friendship where he phones Superman regarding the multiverse problem. He along with his counterparts form a boy band called "Sexx II Men".
 Mad featured Lex Luthor in a parody of Zeke and Luther called "Zeke and Lex Luthor".
 In The Looney Tunes Show, Elmer Fudd is Lex Luthor in Bugs' "Super Rabbit" story.
 In Teen Titans Go!, Lex Luthor's face appears in many banknotes shown in various scenes.

Video games
Lex Luthor has appeared in every electronic game featuring Superman since the first Superman game released for the Atari 2600 with the exception of The Death and Return of Superman.

Superman: Shadow of Apokolips
Lex appeared in Superman: Shadow of Apokolips voiced once again by Clancy Brown. He has various appearances throughout the game while Superman deals with the main threats to Metropolis.

Superman: The Man of Steel
Lex appears in Superman: The Man of Steel, voiced by J. S. Gilbert.

Justice League: Injustice for All
Lex Luthor also appears in the video game Justice League: Injustice for All. In the game, he makes a deal with the alien enemies of Martian Manhunter to help them take over Earth in exchange for them helping him destroy the Justice League and uses the Injustice Gang to do his dirty work. He is defeated by Superman and the Justice League in the final battle and is presumably destroyed after Lex sets his headquarters up to explode with him and the Justice League in it, however, the Justice League managed to escape and Luthor was presumably caught by the explosion. The Justice League stated that if Luthor returned, they would be there to stop him.

Superman Returns
Kevin Spacey reprised his role as Lex Luthor in cutscenes for the Superman Returns video game.

Mortal Kombat vs DC Universe
Lex Luthor is one of the fighters in Mortal Kombat vs. DC Universe, played by Christopher Sean Piereman and voiced by Joe J. Thomas. He is shown to be wearing his power armor in combat. His Mortal Kombat counterpart is Jax.

In the game, Superman accuses Lex Luthor of helping Darkseid invade the Earth. After Darkseid's defeat when Superman used his heat vision on the Boomtube, Superman takes Lex Luthor to someplace more secure than Stryker's Island that has a view of the Earth. When the "world merge crisis" began, he and Catwoman ended up in the Mortal Kombat universe where they fought Jax of the Special Forces and were defeated. He also confronts Green Lantern and battles him for the power ring when the portal he and Catwoman escaped in took them to Oa instead of Earth. Lex Luthor later makes an alliance with Deathstroke and Joker to handle the other-world invaders. They run into Captain Marvel (who had defeated Shang Tsung, Scorpion, and Baraka in the Netherealm) just as Superman arrives.

When Superman tells Lex Luthor that he's supposed to be in jail, Lex Luthor states that the evidence did not hold up. When Captain Marvel reveals the origins of Dark Kahn who is partially made from Darkseid, the Kombat Rage overcomes Lex Luthor who blames Superman for his part in Dark Kahn's creation. Captain Marvel ended up calming both of them down as the villains call a truce with the Justice League. Lex Luthor takes Catwoman to secure the portal technology while Deathstroke and Joker serve as a diversion for some of the "invaders." Lex Luthor then goes after portal technology that belongs to the Mortal Kombat universe (defeating both Scorpion and Sub-Zero on the way) and is confronted by Jax (who has apparently faced him before, as Jax mentions arresting him). After taking down Jax, Lex Luthor ends up fighting Flash (who had defeated Catwoman). When both sides of the characters from the respectful universes meet up, Dark Kahn uses the Kombat Rage to make both sides fight with a shot of Lex Luthor fighting Jax again. With some of the opponents on both sides defeated, Lex Luthor (still consumed by the Kombat Rage) still blames Superman for Dark Kahn's creation and ends up fighting Superman only to be defeated.

In Lex Luthor's ending, it has him using his company to begin portal research after stealing the data for it from the Special Forces. Eventually, he manages to create a portal back to The MK Universe where he meets Quan Chi. The two decide to band together thus forming The "Deadly Alliance".

DC Universe Online
James Marsters reprises his role of Lex Luthor for the video game DC Universe Online. In the game, Luthor leads a war against the Justice League that destroyed all of Earth, helped by Circe, Deathstroke, Black Adam, Metallo, Harley Quinn, and the Joker. Almost all the heroes and villains have been destroyed and Luthor drives Superman out of exile by lethally electrocuting Wonder Woman. Superman flies to Earth after gaining strength from the yellow sun and after defeating Black Adam, angrily assaults Luthor. Luthor recovers after Superman is weakened by the Kryptonite in Wonder Woman's mouth, implanted in there by Luthor. Luthor states that Superman has lost, but Superman claims that Luthor lost by losing everything, Luthor tells Superman that he's beaten him after killing him with a Kryptonite Pike. Afterwards, he looks up to witness the arrival of Brainiac. With most of the heroes and villains dead, Brainiac takes over the planet with little trouble, killing what is left of the planets superhumans, Luthor himself being the only survivor. Realizing that hero and villain must work together, he travels back in time where Superman, Batman, Wonder Woman and the Justice League is still alive and Earth is still intact to warn them of Brainiac's threat. Though they distrust him at first, Luthor says that they must trust him or Earth will be ruled by Brainiac. To this end, he releases stolen nano machines called "exobytes" from Brainiac into the atmosphere, that will give superpowers to whoever they come into contact with, and charges the heroes with training the new superheroes.

Lego series

Lego Batman 2: DC Super Heroes
Lex Luthor appears in Lego Batman 2: DC Super Heroes, once again voiced by Clancy Brown. In the story, Lex broke Joker out of Arkham Asylum with his new weapon, the "Deconstructor", which can take apart any black object, even Batman and his vehicles. He let Joker use it in exchange for his assist in Luthor's presidential campaign. To this end, they break into the Batcave, steal Batman's entire supply of kryptonite, and use it to power a giant Joker robot that can dispense a gas that will convince everyone in Gotham to vote for Lex. However, their plans are foiled when the Justice League appears. Despite Luthor's efforts to destroy them using his large Power Armor in the final boss battle, the armor is destroyed when the Martian Manhunter uses the Watchtower's laser, defeating Lex. After completing story mode, he is found as an optional boss fight and an unlockable character, found at the Yacht Club.

Lego Batman 3: Beyond Gotham
Lex Luthor appears as a playable character using his robotic suit in Lego Batman 3: Beyond Gotham, with Clancy Brown reprising his role. He gathers various villains to form the Legion of Doom so he can sneak in to the Watchtower disguised as Hawkman, hijack the weapons systems and become President of Earth. But he and the others later join with the Justice League to defeat Brainiac. During the adventure he temporarily gets struck with Indigo Lantern energy, filling him with compassion until Superman focuses the Lanterns' energies into a crystal to return Earth back to its normal size. While the Justice League are left occupied with Brainiac, he manages to take over the White House while the Justice league were distracted, but they were sent to jail by the heroes after they defeat Brainiac and restore the remaining cities. He and the Joker mock a miniaturized Brainiac in a bottle that was in their cell, but the bottle gets broken, restoring Brainiac to normal, to Lex and the Joker's horror and panic as Brainiac prepares to get his revenge. Lex's fate is completely unknown afterwards.

Lego Dimensions
Lex Luthor appears as a non-playable boss in the crossover game Lego Dimensions wearing his Power Armor, voiced by Travis Willingham. He fights the three main heroes (Batman, Gandalf, and Wyldstyle) in the world of Ninjago.

Lego DC Super-Villains
Lex Luthor serves as one of the main characters in Lego DC Super-Villains, with Clancy Brown reprising his role once more.

Injustice series

Injustice: Gods Among Us
Lex Luthor appears as a playable character in Injustice: Gods Among Us, with Mark Rolston reprising his role once more. In the "Prime" universe, Luthor leads an attack on the Watchtower battling the Teen Titans before being subdued by Batman's original version. He then reveals that he provided the Joker a nuke to destroy Metropolis, expecting the Justice League to die attempting to stop him and he would rebuild the city in his own image before Nightwing knocked him out. In an alternate universe, Lex is an entrepreneur who has never engaged in any criminal activity as well as an ally and best friend to Superman's alternate version. However, the friendship is a front as his real goal is to stop Superman's Regime, aiding Batman's alternate version's Insurgency in secret, cooperating to create a laser weaponized by Kryptonite. After finishing up the weapon, Lex dones his exo-suit and flies off while having to deal with his Harley Quinn, the alternate Joker, Hawkgirl, and Shazam. After the Watchtower is blown up by Deathstroke, he calls out Superman directly, but he is stopped by Shazam just before he can fire the shot. He is killed moments later by Superman for his betrayal. After the Regime is deposed by Superman's original version, Lex is honored posthumously for his deeds by Cyborg. In Lex's ending in Battle Mode, the original version defeats Superman and takes advantage of his alternate self's heroic sacrifice, becoming a hero to its people and new ruler.

Injustice 2
Lex Luthor is referenced in Injustice 2. After the defeat of Superman's Regime, a special prison was built in honor to his name and appears as the Red Sun Prison stage where Superman, Cyborg, and Damian Wayne were imprisoned. Before his death in his suicide mission to stop Superman, Luthor sent Lucius Fox to send a message to Batman, such as handing his fortunes to Batman while aware of his death and the Insurgency's victory. A memorial statue of Lex appears in the background of Metropolis stage. Additionally, Luthor-Wayne logo appears on equipment inside the Fortress of Solitude stage. In Aquaman's character ending, his marines discover a secret undersea laboratory built by Luthor before his death which contains a dimensional portal that Aquaman decides to use to seek the aid of the alternate universe Justice League in taking down the Regime as Aquaman does not wish to see return to power. Lex is also referred to as Bizarro's creator.

Young Justice: Legacy
Lex Luthor appears in the video game Young Justice: Legacy, with Mark Rolston reprising the role. Lex aids Black Manta in securing the piece of an ancient statue and capturing Aquaman when he investigated the matter in Santa Prisca. Aqualad and The Team arrive to stop them, but Black Manta keeps the heroes occupied while Lex escapes with the piece on a ship. The Team later chase board his ship, with Lex fighting them with a hover vehicle. After the heroes retrieve the piece, Lex leaves them. The technology and weapons used by multiple villains and henchmen in the game is also provided by LexCorp.

Scribblenauts Unmasked: A DC Comics Adventure
Lex appears in the game as an ally for Brainiac. In Metropolis, after Metallo is defeated, Doppelganger turns Luthor into a kryptonian, but Maxwell gives Superman the upper hand by creating Kryptonite. (Superman was immune to its effects as Maxwell gave him lead armour). After Brainiac transports Lex and Doppelgänger into his lair, Superman finds a Starite in one of Lex's safes, which Maxwell collects to add to the Starites needed to get him and his sister home. Luthor is later seen during the final battle on Brainiac's lair, where he uses his robotic suit and summons multiple insectoid Lexbots, many of which are Kryptonite-powered. After the Injustice League is defeated Lex (along with the Joker, Harley Quinn, Cheetah, Ocean Master, Professor Zoom and the Sinestro Corps) is teleported by Brainiac leaving his fate unknown.

Batman: Arkham Knight
Lex Luthor makes a cameo appearance in Batman: Arkham Knight, voiced by Keith Silverstein. He is heard on Bruce Wayne's voicemail offering a deal for Waynetech from Lexcorp, but Bruce has been continually ignoring his offers.

Radio
William Hootkins voiced Luthor in the 1993 BBC Radio drama Superman Lives!.

Novels

Last Son of Krypton
Luthor plays a major role in the Elliot S! Maggin novel Last Son of Krypton.

Lex is a childhood classmate of Clark Kent in Smallville, a scientific genius who blames the then-Superboy for ruining his greatest experiment—the creation of artificial life (in fact it is Lex, celebrating his achievement with a smoke, who starts the fire in his lab). It is at this time that his hair is also burned off. Lex is never again able to replicate his results and holds a lifelong grudge against Superman as a result.

Lex as an adult spends much of his time in prison, but in this story it is described as largely by choice; Lex has the capacity to escape nearly at his leisure, but finds that solitude gives him time to work on his scientific theories and finds dodging manhunts tedious. He learns of a secret document written by his idol Albert Einstein, and breaks out for the express purpose of stealing it, using a hologram of himself as a distraction; however, when he cannot translate it (it is actually written in Kryptonese), turns to an expert linguist who turns out to be a disguised alien who also wishes to steal the documents. Luthor then forms a reluctant alliance with his archenemy Superman to chase the alien to a distant world, using Lex's one-man faster than light starship which he has kept hidden for years in plain sight as a modern art sculpture. When the mysterious alien's greater plans are revealed, Lex must work with Superman to protect the galaxy.

Lex in this story combines aspects of the Silver Age, Bronze Age and film versions. During his robbery of the Einstein papers he uses a hologram of himself dressed in his purple bandoliered jumpsuit with jet-boots (the same Silver Age costume is also used on Super Friends), while he uses a disguise and wig to steal the document; he also holds property and front companies under various names and identities. Luthor is also seen in jail wearing the classic grey prison jumpsuit, and uses a museum hideout similar to the "Luthor's Lair" of the Silver Age comics, though he employs several scientists as underlings, as opposed to the solitary mad scientist of the comics. The novel delves into Lex's personality and viewpoint nearly as much as that of the Man of Steel.

It's Superman!
Lex Luthor also appears in another novel titled It's Superman!, by Tom De Haven.

In the novel, Lex Luthor is alderman of 1930s New York City—used in place of Metropolis—and has a company called Lexco. Despite this, he still feels like something is missing. When he visits his dead mother's grave, he is attacked by hitmen. After he kills them, he feels excitement for the first time. Later in the story, much death and destruction is caused by his robotic "Lexbots". The fiasco leads to his first confrontation with Superman, and Lex believes the void he felt has been filled. By the end of the story, he becomes a wanted criminal, and even he says that he has never been more excited than he is at that moment.

Enemies & Allies
Luthor appears in the Kevin J. Anderson novel Enemies & Allies. Set in the 1950s, his company, LuthorCorp, is buying military contracts via the technological results stolen from Wayne Enterprises. Luthor has either bribed or blackmailed several of Bruce Wayne's board members into smuggling Wayne's designs for Luthor's financial growth. And in the meantime, Luthor has secretly sided with Russian general Ceridov because Ceridov's gulag in Siberia has found a rare, unidentifiable mineral (it is revealed to be kryptonite). Luthor's alliance with Ceridov also guarantees the both of them power to control their own shares of the world: Luthor will get the West side of the planet, while Ceridov controls all countries within Communist boundaries. Their plan was for Ceridov to have three Russian nuclear missiles launched at Metropolis while Luthor, who owns a private island, will destroy all three missiles via a laser weapon so that he will be looked upon as saviour of mankind, while Ceridov will have the blame of the nuclear missiles launching by two other Russian generals. However, his corporate espionage is uncovered by Bruce Wayne/Batman, with Wayne informing the board that they will deliver Luthor only ineffective versions of the components he demands from Wayne Enterprises, with the result that the laser fails to work when the missiles are launched.

Although Superman manages to prevent a nuclear disaster by diverting the missiles into space, Luthor is still peeved at the failure of his laser beam. After a board member who was giving Luthor the technological designs from Wayne Enterprises reveals to Luthor what Wayne knows, Luthor kills the board member and begins to systematically kill off all the others for their uselessness to him. In an attempt to recoup his losses, Luthor stages an alien invasion of Metropolis after Superman has been captured by the Russians, but this plan is thwarted when Batman rescues the Man of Steel, the two heroes defeating the 'invasion'—and identifying the components that made the spacecraft as LuthorCorp manufacture—while Lois Lane uncovers evidence of Luthor's dealings with the Russians. Although Lex attempts to defend himself by arguing that the subsequent trial focus on the technology he developed to carry out the 'invasion', he is nevertheless sentenced to death by electric chair, simply noting in response to the judge informing him that the chair he will die in was designed by LuthorCorp that he is sure it will work, although he is privately already considering how he might escape.

References